Md. Ruhul Alam Siddique is the High Commissioner of Bangladesh to Pakistan and former ambassador of Bangladesh to Portugal.

Early life 
Siddique has a Masters of Public Administration from the University of Dhaka. He has a Masters in Foreign Affairs and Trade from Monash University. He joined the 11th batch of Bangladesh Civil Service.

Career
Siddique has served in the Bangladesh Embassy in Germany and Singapore.

Siddique served as a minister in the High Commission of Bangladesh to India. He was then made the Deputy High Commissioner of Bangladesh to Pakistan.

Siddique was the Director General (East Asia & Pacific Wing) at the Ministry of Foreign Affairs. He was appointed the Ambassador of Bangladesh to Portugal on 27 September 2016 and stationed in Lisbon. He met with representatives from Federation of Bangladesh Chambers of Commerce and Industry in November 2017 in a bit to increase trade between Portugal and Bangladesh.

Siddique was appointed the High Commissioner of Bangladesh to Pakistan on 20 July 2020. He oversaw the celebration of the 51st Armed Forces Day of Bangladesh in Islamabad in 2021.

References

Ambassadors of Bangladesh to Portugal
High Commissioners of Bangladesh to Pakistan
University of Dhaka alumni
Monash University alumni